Nareshtar or Narinjlar is a village that is, de facto, in the Martakert Province of the breakaway Republic of Artsakh; de jure it is in the Kalbajar District of Azerbaijan, in the disputed region of Nagorno-Karabakh. The village had an Azerbaijani-majority population prior to their exodus during the First Nagorno-Karabakh War.

History 
During the Soviet period, the village was part of the Mardakert District of the Nagorno-Karabakh Autonomous Oblast.

Economy and culture 
The population is mainly engaged in agriculture and animal husbandry. The village is part of the community of Vank.

Demographics 
The village had an ethnic Armenian-majority population of 10 inhabitants in 2005, and 4 inhabitants in 2015.

References

External links 

 

Populated places in Martakert Province
Populated places in Kalbajar District